Events from the year 1598 in Sweden.

Incumbents
 Monarch – Sigismund

Events
 16 January - The Rurik Dynasty collapses when Feodor I of Russia dies.
May - Sigismund III return to Avaskär, Sweden, and his uncle and regent Duke Charles resist him resulting in the War against Sigismund.
 18 September - The Battle of Stegeborg results in victory for the Polish-Swedish unionists. 
 25 September - The Battle of Stångebro results in victory for the Swedish rebels under Duke Charles and the end of the union.

Births
 - Georg Stiernhielm, linguist
 - Lars Stigzelius, archbishop
 - Sten Svantesson Bielke, soldier and politician
 - Åke Henriksson Tott, soldier and politician

Deaths
 10 February - Anne of Austria, Queen of Poland, queen consort   (born 1578)
 4 August - William Cecil, 1st Baron Burghley, English statesmen.
 7 August - Georg Stiernhielm, linguist and mathematician (died 1672)

References

 
Years of the 16th century in Sweden
Sweden